Helm Glacier is a glacier,  long, flowing north to enter Lowery Glacier just west of the Fazekas Hills, in the Queen Elizabeth Range of Antarctica. It was named for Arthur S. Helm, former Secretary of the Ross Sea Committee, by the New Zealand Geological Survey Antarctic Expedition (1961–62).

References

Glaciers of Shackleton Coast